Stoneleigh Abbey Gatehouse is the 14th century gatehouse to the medieval Stoneleigh Abbey which was established  near Stoneleigh, Warwickshire in the 12th century. It is a Grade I listed building.

The red brick Decorated style Gatehouse, built in 1346 by Abbot Adam de Hokele, is all that remains visible of the monastic buildings.

References

   A History of the County of Warwick, Volume 2 (1908) pp 78-81 from British History Online
   Warwickshire County Council Timtrail

Grade I listed buildings in Warwickshire
Gates in England
Gatehouses (architecture)